Brod is a rural locality (a selo) and the administrative center of Brodovskoye Rural Settlement, Chernushinsky District, Perm Krai, Russia. The population was 698 as of 2010. There are 13 streets.

Geography 
Brod is located 6 km west of Chernushka (the district's administrative centre) by road. Rakino is the nearest rural locality.

References 

Rural localities in Chernushinsky District